Cellana vitiensis is a species of limpet, a marine gastropod mollusc in the family Nacellidae, the true limpets.

References

 Powell A.W.B. (1973). The patellid limpets of the world (Patellidae). Indo-Pacific Mollusca, 3(15):75-206.

Nacellidae
Gastropods described in 1973